Jim Balent is an American comics artist, writer, and publisher from Pennsylvania. He is best known for his long run on Catwoman between 1993 and 1999. Balent has also drawn Batman and Lobo for DC Comics, as well as some of the issues of Purgatori for the independent comic book publisher Chaos! Comics.

Career
Balent's early work for DC Comics includes backup stories in Sgt. Rock such as "The Deadliest Casualty" in issue #393 (October 1984) and "The Ninja" in #397 (February 1985). An Atom story drawn by Balent was published as a Bonus Book in Power of the Atom #4 (November 1988). Balent and writer Jo Duffy launched an ongoing Catwoman series in August 1993. Balent drew Catwoman through issue #77 (February 2000). He and writer Chuck Dixon created Geist in Detective Comics Annual #6 (1993). As the artist of Catwoman, Balent worked on several Batman crossover stories including "Contagion", "Cataclysm", and "No Man's Land". In 1999, Balent left mainstream comics to form his own company, BroadSword Comics, which publishes Tarot: Witch of the Black Rose, written and drawn by Balent himself. In an interview with Project Fanboy, a comic book website, Balent spoke of his interest in both entertaining as well as educating his readers about the folklore and actual theology of Wicca and witchcraft with interviews with leading witch authors and spells from witches around the world. Balent drew a retailer exclusive variant cover for Batman vol. 3 #50 (September 2018) for Jetpack Comics / Forbidden Planet.

Awards
On March 1, 2009, Balent's company, BroadSword Comics, won three of the 25 categories in the inaugural Project Fanboy Awards and was nominated for ten other categories at the MegaCon convention. His title Tarot: Witch of the Black Rose won in the categories of "Best Title" and "Best Indy Title", and the character Raven Hex from the aforementioned title won in the category of "Best Indy Villain".

Bibliography

BroadSword Comics
 3 Little Kittens: Purrr-fect Weapons #1–3 (2002)
 Tarot: Witch of the Black Rose #1–132 (2000–)

Chaos Comics
 Purgatori: Prelude #1 (1996)
 Purgatori: The Vampires Myth #1–3 (1996)

Dark Horse Comics
 Dark Horse Presents #71–73 (1993)

DC Comics

 Batman #507 (1994)
 Batman 80-Page Giant #2 (1999)
 Batman: Batgirl #1 (1998)
 Batman: Brotherhood of the Bat #1 (1995)
 Catwoman vol. 2 #1–30, 33–77, #0, #1000000, Annual #2; #31–32 (layouts) (1993–2000)
 Catwoman/Vampirella: The Furies #1 (1997)
 Catwoman: Guardian of Gotham #1–2 (1999)
 Darkstars #7 (1993)
 Detective Comics #660, Annual #6 (1993)
 Green Lantern Corps Quarterly #4–6 (1993)
 Green Lantern: Mosaic #9 (1993)
 Legends of the Dark Claw #1 (1996)
 Lobo's Big Babe Spring Break Special #1 (1995)
 Power of the Atom #4 (Bonus Book) (1988)
 Sgt. Rock #393, 397 (backup stories) (1984–1985)
 Showcase '95 #4 (Catwoman) (1995)

First Comics
 Evangeline #11–12 (1989)
 Nexus #42 (1988)

Harris Comics
 Vampirella #1–3 (1992–1993)

References

External links
 
 
 Jim Balent at Mike's Amazing World of Comics

20th-century American artists
21st-century American artists
American comics artists
American comics writers
American company founders
American publishers (people)
Artists from Pennsylvania
Comic book publishers (people)
DC Comics people
Living people
Writers from Pennsylvania
Year of birth missing (living people)
Place of birth missing (living people)